A Zwinger is part of a medieval castle or town fortification. It may also refer to:

Fortifications and enclosures 
 Zwinger (Goslar), a battery tower in the town fortifications of Goslar
 Zwinger (Münster), part of the town fortifications of Münster
 Zwinger (Dresden), a stately building and park area with museums in Dresden

People with the surname 
 Gustav Philipp Zwinger (1779–1819), German artist, etcher and lithographer
 Thorsten Zwinger (born 1962), German artist
 Theodor Zwinger (1533–1588), Swiss physician and Christian humanist scholar

German-language surnames